Unit distance may refer to:
Astronomical unit: the distance to the Sun
Unit distance graph: a graph whose lines connect points that must be a distance apart that is equal to one
Unit interval: the set of all real-numbered points on the closed interval 
 Unit vector: a vector normalized to length one for analytical purposes